The Last of the Ingrams is a 1917 American silent drama film directed by Walter Edwards and starring William Desmond, Margery Wilson and Robert McKim.

Cast
 William Desmond as Jules Ingram
 Margery Wilson as Mercy Reed
 Robert McKim as Rufus Moore
 Walt Whitman as Israel Spence
 Mary Armlyn as Agnes Moore
 Thelma Salter as Ruth Moore

References

Bibliography
 Katchmer, George A. A Biographical Dictionary of Silent Film Western Actors and Actresses. McFarland, 2015.

External links
 

1917 films
1917 drama films
1910s English-language films
American silent feature films
Silent American drama films
American black-and-white films
Triangle Film Corporation films
Films directed by Walter Edwards
1910s American films